The McKell ministry (1944–1947) or Second McKell ministry was the 51st ministry of the New South Wales Government, and was led by the 27th Premier, William McKell, of the Labor Party. The ministry was the second of two occasions when the Government was led by McKell, as Premier.

McKell was first elected to the New South Wales Legislative Assembly in 1917 and served continuously until 1947, when he resigned to become the 12th Governor-General of Australia. Having served as a junior minister in the first and third ministries of Jack Lang, during the 1930s McKell came to oppose Lang's dictatorial rule and critical of electoral failures. In 1939 McKell displaced Lang as Labor leader and NSW Leader of the Opposition. McKell led Labor to victory at the 1941 state election, defeating the United Australia Party / Country Party coalition of Alexander Mair and Michael Bruxner. McKell and his government were re-elected for a subsequent term at the 1944 state election.

This ministry covers the period from 8 June 1944 until 6 February 1947 when McKell resigned to become Governor-General of Australia. McKell was succeeded by Jim McGirr.

Composition of ministry
The composition of the ministry was announced by Premier McKell on 8 June 1944. There was a minor reshuffle in May 1946 following the appointment of Jack Tully as Agent-General for New South Wales in London.

 
Ministers are members of the Legislative Assembly unless otherwise noted.

See also

First McKell ministry
Members of the New South Wales Legislative Assembly, 1944-1947
Members of the New South Wales Legislative Council, 1943-1946
Members of the New South Wales Legislative Council, 1946-1949

References

 

! colspan="3" style="border-top: 5px solid #cccccc" | New South Wales government ministries

New South Wales ministries
1944 establishments in Australia
1947 disestablishments in Australia
Australian Labor Party ministries in New South Wales